Wentworth County is one of the 141 Cadastral divisions of New South Wales. The Murray River is the boundary to the south, and the Anabranch of the Darling River is the western boundary. It includes the area where the Darling River joins the Murray River.

Wentworth County was named in honour of the explorer and statesman William Charles Wentworth.

Parishes within this county
A full list of parishes found within this county; their current LGA and mapping coordinates to the approximate centre of each location is as follows:

References

Counties of New South Wales